Olleya aquimaris is a Gram-negative and motile bacterium from the genus of Olleya which has been isolated from seawater from the Baekdo harbour from the Sea of Japan.

References

Flavobacteria
Bacteria described in 2010